Hilary Little is Professor of Addiction Science at St George's, University of London and the Institute of Psychiatry. Little's research has a focus on alcohol dependence including pharmacological treatments, influence of stress in alcohol dependence and the effects of chronic alcohol consumption on memory. Little is a member of the British Pharmacological Society, the British Association for Psychopharmacology and the Research Society on Alcoholism and a reviewing editor of the Addition Biology journal.

Selected publications
 Diana, Marco, Mark Brodie, Annalisa Muntoni, Maria C. Puddu, Giuliano Pillolla, Scott Steffensen, Saturnino Spiga, and Hilary J. Little. "Enduring effects of chronic ethanol in the CNS: basis for alcoholism." Alcoholism: Clinical and Experimental Research 27, no. 2 (2003): 354–361. 
 Little, Hilary J. "Behavioral mechanisms underlying the link between smoking and drinking." Alcohol Research & Health (2000).
 Little, Hilary J. "The contribution of electrophysiology to knowledge of the acute and chronic effects of ethanol." Pharmacology & Therapeutics 84, no. 3 (1999): 333–353.

References

Academics of King's College London
British pharmacologists
British women academics
Academics of St George's, University of London
British psychologists
Living people
Year of birth missing (living people)